A fire in Iloilo City on February 7, 1966 destroyed nearly three quarters of the City Proper area, the central business district, of Iloilo City in the Philippines. It is the single most devastating fire in the city's history.

The 12-hour-long fire began at a lumberyard on Iznart Street then spread across Quezon and Valeria streets. The fire trucks of the government, the now-Bureau of Fire Protection, were ill-equipped to fight the fire because they had to travel  to Jaro, Iloilo City to fill their water tanks.

After the fire, commercial activity returned to the area with many of surviving concrete commercial buildings being rebuilt, but the area was left with fewer residents since many homes were replaced by commercial structures. Some survivors were relocated to the district of La Paz in Iloilo City.

Among the commercial buildings impacted was the Majestic Theater, which was rebuilt. New commercial landmarks constructed include the Marymart Center, a shopping mall, and the new Iloilo branch of the Philippine National Bank.

In the aftermath of the fire, the Iloilo Filipino Chinese Fire Prevention Association Incorporated was established. It is now known as Federation Iloilo Volunteer Fire Brigade. It is one of the two private volunteer fire departments, though they include some part-time on-call firefighters.

References

History of Iloilo City
Fires in the Philippines
1966 fires in Asia
Urban fires in Asia